James Whatman may refer to:

 James Whatman (politician) (1813–1887), English Liberal politician
 James Whatman (papermaker) (1702–1759), English paper maker

See also
 Whatman (disambiguation)